Thalassophryne is a genus of toadfishes found in the western Atlantic Ocean with one species (T. amazonica) found in the Amazon River and some of its tributaries.

Species
There are currently six recognized species in this genus:
 Thalassophryne amazonica Steindachner, 1876
 Thalassophryne maculosa Günther, 1861 (Cano toadfish)
 Thalassophryne megalops B. A. Bean & A. C. Weed, 1910
 Thalassophryne montevidensis (C. Berg (es), 1893)
 Thalassophryne nattereri Steindachner, 1876
 Thalassophryne punctata Steindachner, 1876

Venom
Members of the genus Thalassophyne are venomous. Venom is delivered through two hollow spines on the dorsal fin and two spines on pre-opercular regions, a venomous gland is located at the base of the spines and can be erected or depressed by the fish.

References

Further reading
 

Batrachoididae
Taxa named by Albert Günther